University Avenue station is an under-construction Manila Metro Rail Transit (MRT) station situated on Line 7 and will serve as the eastern terminus of the proposed Line 8. It is located along Commonwealth Avenue in UP Campus, Quezon City, Philippines. The station itself is located within the campus of the University of the Philippines Diliman and is named after University Avenue, the main road leading towards the university. The MRT Line 7 system has a proposed spur line to connect itself to the LRT Line 2 at Katipunan station, passing through the University of the Philippines Diliman and Katipunan Avenue, while the Line 8 system will terminate at this station with a spur line towards its depot further inside UP Diliman. Construction started on August 15, 2017 and was expected to end around April 2018.

When completed, the station will serve the following destinations: University of the Philippines Diliman, U.P.–Ayala Land TechnoHub, Philippine Coconut Authority (PhilCoa), and the Commission on Human Rights Complex.

The station, unlike the separate Quezon Memorial stations of Lines 7 and 8, will be situated at the same complex with the Line 8 building platforms side-by-side the Line 7 platforms thereby creating a common station.

References

External links
 

Manila Metro Rail Transit System stations
Railway stations under construction in the Philippines